Matthew Putman is an American drummer, percussionist, and multi-instrumentalist based in Arkansas. He is best known for being a member of the bands Norma Jean, Unwed Sailor, Living Sacrifice, and Lovedrug, as well as his work as a producer and engineer.

Musical career

Putman began his career in 1996 when he formed the Mathcore band Eso-Charis in Fort Smith, Arkansas with his brother Cory Brandan Putman, who later went on to join Norma Jean. When Eso-Charis disbanded in 1998, Putman joined the heavy metal band Living Sacrifice from 1998 to 2003, playing percussion on their seminal albums The Hammering Process and Conceived in Fire.

In 2002, Putman joined the indie rock band Unwed Sailor. He appeared on the albums The Marionette and the Music Box, White Ox, and Little Wars. During this time he also joined the Canton, Ohio alternative rock band Lovedrug from 2003 to 2005, appearing on the albums Pretend You're Alive, Everything Starts Where It Ends, and the Everything Starts... EP.

Putman has appeared as a sideman on several albums by bands such as Norma Jean, Chase Pagan, and The Last Royals.

Bands

Discography

References

External links
 Matthew Putman of Living Sacrifice, Eso-Charis, Lovedrug, and every other band ever. As the Story Grows. Trav Turner.
 Matthew Putman on Discogs

1977 births
Living people
20th-century American drummers
American male drummers
21st-century American drummers
20th-century American male musicians
21st-century American male musicians
Eso-Charis members